The 1904 Missouri Tigers football team was an American football team that represented the University of Missouri as an independent during the 1904 college football season. The team compiled a 3–6 record and was outscored by its opponents by a combined total of 130 to 50. John McLean was the head coach for the second of three seasons. The team played its home games at Rollins Field in Columbia, Missouri.

Schedule

References

Missouri
Missouri Tigers football seasons
Missouri Tigers football